"Galaxy" is a song performed by Australian singer-songwriter Dannii Minogue. It was released worldwide on 10 November 2017.

Background
In June 2017, after the release of "Holding On", Minogue said she would be releasing more music before the end of the year, in order to coincide with her appearance as a special guest on Take That's Australian tour.

"Galaxy" was written by Australian singer-songwriter Sia but was not included on any of her albums. It was later presented to Minogue by Sia's manager while she was looking for recording studios in Los Angeles.

Dannii said the song was "classic Sia" with "huge vocal with beautiful melodies" and that she was "feeling the joy and happiness" of it and "could see why this wouldn't go with what Sia was doing" as her album features "really moody" lyrics. Minogue also said that the experience of sending her version to Sia was "nerve-wrecking" [sic] but the songwriter "really liked it".

The single announcement was made on Minogue's Instagram profile on 3 November along with the artwork. On the same day, pre-order links for the songs were made available on all major digital music services.

Music video
On 9 November a music video for the song was made available on Minogue's official YouTube channel. The video was produced by Melbourne-based company Robot Army Productions and was directed by Nick W Lord.

Track listing
These are the formats and track listings of major single releases of "Galaxy".

Single
"Galaxy" – 3:58

Chris Young Remix
"Galaxy" (Chris Young Remix) – 5:01

Gawler Remix
"Galaxy" (Gawler Remix) – 5:45
"Galaxy" (Gawler Remix Radio Edit) – 3:44

Personnel
Credits adapted from YouTube.

Dannii Minogue – lead vocals
Sia Furler – songwriter
Rene Arenault – songwriter
Bill Mohler  – songwriter
Ian Masterson for Thriller Jill – producer and mixer
James Hurr – additional programming
Joe Holweger – guitar and bass
Robot Army Productions – video
Nick W Lord – creative director
Celeste Ben Jackson – hair and make-up

References

2017 singles
2017 songs
Dannii Minogue songs
Songs written by Sia (musician)